Conus taitensis is a species of sea snail, a marine gastropod mollusk, in the family Conidae, the cone snails and their allies.

Distribution
This marine species occurs in the South Pacific off the Marquesas Islands

References

 Tucker J.K. & Tenorio M.J. (2013) Illustrated catalog of the living cone shells. 517 pp. Wellington, Florida: MdM Publishing.

External links
 Bruguière J.G. (1789-1792). Encyclopédie méthodique ou par ordre de matières. Histoire naturelle des vers, volume 1. Paris: Pancoucke. Pp. i-xviii, 1-344 [Livraison 32, June 1789; 345-757 ]

taitensis